Star Trek: Music from the Motion Picture is a soundtrack album for the 2009 film Star Trek, composed by Michael Giacchino. The score was recorded in October 2008 since the film was originally scheduled to be released the following December. It was performed by the Hollywood Studio Symphony and Page LA Studio Voices at the Sony Scoring Stage in Culver City, California. The score incorporates the "Theme from Star Trek" by Alexander Courage and Gene Roddenberry.

Track listing

The Deluxe Edition
In 2010, Varèse Sarabande released a greatly expanded 5000-copy limited edition album of the score entitled Star Trek: The Deluxe Edition. Now out of print, the album features many previously unreleased cues, including ones for the fight on the drill and Spock's attempt to save his mother. In addition, there was a mistake in the printing of the deluxe edition's CD booklet. A completely different list of orchestra player names was printed by accident, instead of the group that actually performed the score for the film. A correct listing of the orchestra players who actually performed the score can be found, properly credited and listed, in the booklet that came with the original one-disc edition of the soundtrack.  In 2019 Varèse Sarabande issued a 1500 limited edition reissue.

Album cues from the original CD are bolded in the following track listing, though the lengths of several of the original CD cues are different.

Disc 1:

Disc 2:

Personnel
Credits derived from Allmusic:

Production
Michael Giacchino – composer, producer
Alexander Courage – original material
Gene Roddenberry – original material
J. J. Abrams – executive producer
Bryan Burk – executive producer
Hollywood Studio Symphony – orchestra
Reggie Wilson – orchestra contractor
Page LA Studio Voices – choir/chorus
Bobbi Page – vocal contractor

Orchestration and technical
Peter Boyer – arranger, orchestration
Richard Bronskill – arranger, orchestration
Stephen M. Davis – audio engineer
George Drakoulias – music consultant
Jack Hayes – arranger, orchestration
Larry Kenton – orchestration
Erick Labson – mastering, remastering
Alex Levy – music editor
Chad Seiter – orchestration
Tim Simonec – arranger, conductor, orchestration
Randy Spendlove – executive in charge of music
Chris Tilton – arranger, orchestration
Robert Townson – executive in charge of music
Dan Wallin – audio engineer, mixing, recording
Booker White – music preparation

See also
 List of Star Trek composers and music

References

External links
 Star Trek: Music from the Motion Picture at Varèse Sarabande
 Star Trek Soundtracks

Music based on Star Trek
2009 soundtrack albums
Science fiction soundtracks
Michael Giacchino soundtracks
Action film soundtracks
Science fiction film soundtracks